Żary may refer to the following places:
Żary, Łódź Voivodeship (central Poland)
Żary, Lublin Voivodeship (east Poland)
Żary in Lubusz Voivodeship (west Poland)
Żary, Lesser Poland Voivodeship (south Poland)